Jahaan Chaar Yaar  is a 2022 Indian Hindi-language female buddy comedy-drama film written and directed by Kamal Pandey and produced by Vinod Bachchan. The film stars Swara Bhaskar, Meher Vij, Shikha Talsania and Pooja Chopra. The film did not get any publicity or viewers and is considered the latest in a long line of Bhaskar's box-office bombs.

Cast
Swara Bhaskar as Shivangi
Meher Vij as Mnasi
Pooja Chopra as Sakina
Shikha Talsania as Neha
Girish Kulkarni as Madhukar Rane
Nirbhay Wadhwa 
Vibha Chibber as Shivangi's Mother-in-law
Manish Chaudhari DCP Mohit

Production
The film was officially announced by Swara Bhaskar in 2021 and started shooting in Lucknow. Filming started in Goa for second schedule and halted for COVID-19 infection.
Filming finished on 20 September 2021.

Soundtrack

The music of the film is composed by Anand Raj Anand, Sanjeev Chaturvedi and Rashid Khan . The first song "What The Luck" Featuring Mika Singh was released on 29 August 2022.

References

External links
 

Indian comedy-drama films
2022 films
2022 comedy-drama films
2020s Hindi-language films